The Panoz Abruzzi was a grand tourer intended for manufacture by Panoz Auto Development for the European market. Production was to be limited to 81 units and it was expected to be delivered between 2011 and 2013, with a retail price of around £330,000. Much of the car was to be made of a multilayer composite known as REAMS (Recyclable Energy Absorbing Matrix System), which Panoz claimed was as strong as carbon fiber but was more durable and could have been recycled. 

The Abruzzi made its sports car racing debut at the 12 Hours of Sebring in 2011.

In July 2014, production of the Abruzzi was not confirmed and it no longer appeared on the company's website.

The name of the car refers to the old name of Italian region of Abruzzo, where Don Panoz's grandfather lived before the 1915 earthquake forced him and his family to move to United States.

Performance 
It also features a "Trifecta" cooling system that uses multiple rear mounted radiators in addition to other cooling systems to keep coolant temperatures down.

References

External links
Panoz Auto Development

Abruzzi
Grand tourers
Concept cars